The New Lantao Bus Company (1973) Limited, commonly known as New Lantao Bus or NLB, is a franchised bus company operating in Hong Kong. It mainly operates bus routes on Lantau Island.

History
NLB was formed in 1973 through the merger of three bus companies operated by residents of Lantau Island, and became the third franchised bus company on 1 April 1974.

In January 1992, NLB became a subsidiary of Kwoon Chung Bus Holdings.

NLB's franchise was extended on 1 April 1997 to run until 31 March 2007. It was extended again until 1 March 2017. The current franchise runs from 1 March 2017 to 1 March 2027.

Before the construction of Tung Chung New Town, almost all of NLB's routes terminated at Mui Wo. During that time when there were no major towns on Lantau Island, most of the company's routes aimed at connecting the smaller villages around the island to the ferry at Mui Wo. Currently, however, most routes terminate at Tung Chung, where land-based public transport connection to the urban area and Hong Kong International Airport are available. Many of those that formerly terminated at Mui Wo have since been discontinued.

Coverage
As at March 2018, it operated 23 franchised routes. In 2017 its network carried around 77,000 passengers per day.

The major service area of the company is Lantau Island. New Lantao Bus was the only bus company operating on the island since its formation until 1997, when Tung Chung New Town was built and road connection to the rest of Hong Kong was opened. It continues to be the only bus company serving the southern part of the Island, carrying an average of 25,000 passengers daily in 2002. It operates 16 regular routes, 4 overnight routes, 2 school-day only routes, 4 holiday-only routes and 1 airport route and 1 special route on Lantau Island as of December 2018.

Most of the routes terminate at Mui Wo and Tung Chung, where there are ferries and MTR to connect to other parts of the territory. Some routes are short-haul routes within the Tung Chung new town. NLB operates a holiday route numbered 1R, running from Hung Hom in Kowloon to Ngong Ping with eight departures on Sundays and public holidays.

In 2007, the Hong Kong–Shenzhen Western Corridor opened, providing a fourth road border crossing with mainland China. NLB won the right to operate a cross-border bus route B2, which runs from Yuen Long MTR station to the border checkpoint at Deep Bay. This mark the first time the company operates a route completely outside Lantau Island.

Fleet

As of March 2018, the operator owns a fleet of 110 single-decker and 25 double-decker buses.

The current fleet are single-deck buses in majority with a few number of double-deck buses (MAN A95). Most of the single-deck buses operated by New Lantao Bus are German-built MAN buses with local bodywork. Japanese-built Isuzus used to be the majority before 2009.

New Lantao Bus is the only franchised bus operator in Hong Kong operating Isuzu buses. Most are (tourist) coaches instead of city buses found in urban, except those running within the Tung Chung new town and cross border routes (B2 series, between Yuen Long District and Shenzhen Bay Port). This is due to rough road conditions in southern Lantau Island.

Such buses are of a high floor design and fitted with a powerful engine. They are fitted with air-conditioning systems like most buses in Hong Kong. The air-conditioning systems of the Isuzus are powered by a separate engine instead of the main engine. This allows the main engine to operate on its full power when climbing up steep slopes in the southern Lantau.

The Isuzu buses aged quickly owing to rough roads on Lantau, and their climbing performance is relatively inferior to the newer MAN buses. MAN "coaches" gradually replaced the role of the Isuzu buses around 2009, becoming the majority of the operator's fleet currently.

References

External links

Official website
Information of Hong Kong government's website

Bus companies of Hong Kong
Transport companies established in 1973
NWS Holdings
1973 establishments in Hong Kong